Flora Svecica ("Flora of Sweden", ed. 1, Stockholm, 1745; ed. 2 Stockholm, 1755) was written by Swedish botanist, physician, zoologist and naturalist Carl Linnaeus (1707–1778).

This was the first full account of the plants growing in Sweden and one of the first examples of the Flora in the modern idiom. The full title of the publication was Flora Svecica: Enumerans Plantas Sueciae Indigenas Cum Synopsi Classium Ordinumque, Characteribus Generum, Differentiis Specierum, Synonymis Citationibusque Selectis - Locis Regionibusque Natalibus - Descriptionibus Habitualibus Nomina Incolarum Et Qualitat.

Bibliographic details
Full bibliographic details including exact dates of publication, pagination, editions, facsimiles, brief outline of contents, location of copies, secondary sources, translations, reprints, manuscripts, travelogues, and commentaries are given in Stafleu and Cowan's Taxonomic Literature.

See also
Flora Lapponica

References

Bibliography
 Frodin, David 2002. Guide to Standard Floras of the World, 2nd ed.  Cambridge University Press: Cambridge.
 Stafleu, Frans A. & Cowan, Richard S. 1981. "Taxonomic Literature. A Selective Guide to Botanical Publications with dates, Commentaries and Types. Vol III: Lh–O." Regnum Vegetabile 105.

External links

Books about Sweden
Florae (publication)
Carl Linnaeus
.
Botany in Europe
1745 books
1745 in science
Botanical nomenclature
18th-century Latin books